The Fokker XHB-2 was a proposed heavy bomber envisaged by the Fokker Aircraft Corporation of America in 1927. The leadership of the United States Army Air Corps found the XHB-2 design too radical to be a real proposition, so the design remained a paper project only.

Specifications

See also

References

XHB-2
1920s United States bomber aircraft
High-wing aircraft